Sunetra Gupta (born 15 March 1965) is an Indian-born British infectious disease epidemiologist and a professor of theoretical epidemiology at the Department of Zoology, University of Oxford. She has performed research on the transmission dynamics of various infectious diseases, including malaria, influenza and COVID-19, and has received the Scientific Medal of the Zoological Society of London and the Rosalind Franklin Award of the Royal Society. She is a member of the scientific advisory board of Collateral Global, an organisation which examines the global impact of COVID-19 restrictions.

Gupta is also a novelist and a recipient of the Sahitya Akademi Award.

Early life and education
Gupta was born in Calcutta, India, to Dhruba and Minati Gupta. She trained in biology, and was awarded a bachelor's degree from Princeton University. In 1992 she obtained her PhD from Imperial College London for a thesis on the transmission dynamics of infectious diseases.

Career and research

Positions
Gupta is a professor of theoretical epidemiology in the Department of Zoology at the University of Oxford, where she leads a team of infectious disease epidemiologists. She has undertaken research on various infectious diseases, including malaria, HIV, influenza, bacterial meningitis and COVID-19. She is a supernumerary fellow of Merton College, Oxford. She also sits on the European Advisory Board of Princeton University Press.

In April 2021, she received a £90,000 donation from the Georg and Emily von Opel Foundation. In May 2022 she joined a partnership with Blue Water Vaccines, Inc. to apply her research to the development of a universal flu vaccine.

Awards 
Gupta has been awarded the 2007 Scientific Medal by the Zoological Society of London and the 2009 Royal Society Rosalind Franklin Award. In July 2013, Gupta's portrait was on display during the prestigious Royal Society's Summer Science Exhibition along with leading female scientist such as Madame Curie.

COVID-19 

In March 2020, some modelling of the COVID-19 pandemic by Gupta and colleagues was released to the media. Their model suggested that up to 68% of the UK population could already have been infected, suggesting broader immunity and a subsiding threat. The findings differed greatly from the work of other experts and quickly came under criticism. In May that year, she told UnHerd that she believed "the epidemic has largely come and is on its way out in [the UK]. So, I think [the infection fatality rate] would be definitely less than one in a thousand, and probably closer to one in ten thousand." Both before and after this statement, the estimates of other experts have fallen in a range much higher than this.

Gupta has been a critic of lockdowns in the pandemic. She was one of the primary authors of the Great Barrington Declaration in 2020, which advocated lifting COVID-19 restrictions on lower-risk groups to develop herd immunity through infection, while stating that vulnerable people should be protected from the virus. The World Health Organization, as well as numerous other academic and public-health bodies, stated that the strategy proposed by the declaration is dangerous, unethical, and lacks a sound scientific basis. The American Public Health Association and 13 other public-health groups in the United States said in a joint open letter that the Great Barrington Declaration "is not a strategy, it is a political statement" and said it was "selling false hope that will predictably backfire".

In 2021, she was an author at the Brownstone Institute, a new think tank founded by Jeffrey Tucker where senior roles were held by Martin Kulldorff and Jay Bhattacharya, her co-authors on the Great Barrington Declaration.

Works of fiction
Gupta wrote her first works of fiction in Bengali. She was a translator of the poetry of Rabindranath Tagore. She has published several novels in English. In October 2012 her fifth novel, So Good in Black, was longlisted for the DSC Prize for South Asian Literature. Her novels have been awarded the Sahitya Akademi Award, the Southern Arts Literature Prize, shortlisted for the Crossword Award, and longlisted for the Orange Prize.

Personal life
Gupta was married to the Irish vaccinologist Adrian V. S. Hill from 1994 to 2020. They have two daughters. Gupta has dismissed claims of having a right-wing perspective, claiming to be "more Left than Labour".

Selected works

Journal articles

Novels
Memories of Rain (1992)
The Glassblower's Breath (1993)
Moonlight into Marzipan (1995)
A Sin of Colour (1999)
So Good in Black (2009)

References

External links
 Profile on the Website of the Oxford Department of Zoology

 Sunetra Gupta at AcademiaNet

1965 births
Living people
Princeton University alumni
Alumni of Imperial College London
Fellows of Merton College, Oxford
Indian emigrants to England
Recipients of the Sahitya Akademi Award in English
Indian medical researchers
20th-century Indian translators
Indian women science writers
Indian social sciences writers
Indian epidemiologists
Women evolutionary biologists
Bengali chemists
Scientists from Kolkata
21st-century Indian women scientists
21st-century Indian scientists
Indian women medical researchers
20th-century Indian women scientists
20th-century Indian scientists
Women scientists from West Bengal
Women writers from West Bengal
20th-century Indian novelists
20th-century Indian women writers
Indian women translators
Indian women novelists
21st-century Indian translators
21st-century Indian novelists
Novelists from West Bengal
Writers from Kolkata
21st-century Indian women writers
Women epidemiologists